Veronica Necula (born 15 May 1967) is a retired Romanian rower. Competing both in coxed fours and eights she won two medals at the 1988 Olympics and two world titles in 1987. After retiring from competitions she worked as a rowing coach at her native club CSA Steaua Bucuresti.

References

External links
 

1967 births
Living people
Romanian female rowers
Sportspeople from Târgoviște
Rowers at the 1988 Summer Olympics
Rowers at the 1992 Summer Olympics
Olympic silver medalists for Romania
Olympic bronze medalists for Romania
Olympic rowers of Romania
Olympic medalists in rowing
World Rowing Championships medalists for Romania
Medalists at the 1992 Summer Olympics
Medalists at the 1988 Summer Olympics